Ron Adams (born July 24, 1966) is a former American football quarterback for the Detroit Drive and Tampa Bay Storm of the Arena Football League (AFL). He played college football at Eastern Michigan.

Early life
Adams attended Taylor Center High School in Taylor, Michigan.

College career
Adams continued his football career at Eastern Michigan. Adams lead the Eagles to the 1987 Mid-American Conference (MAC) championship, and was twice named an All-MAC selection. He was inducted into the E-Club Athletic Hall of Fame in 1999.

Statistics
Adams' statistics are as follows:

Professional career
He played for the Detroit Drive of the Arena Football League from 1991-1993. He served as a backup quarterback, starting a few games during the 1992 ArenaBowl Championship season.

Adams came back to arena football in 1997 with the Tampa Bay Storm. Adams spent 3 seasons as the backup quarterback.

Coaching career
Adams coached for 24 years, serving as a head coach for 13 of those years, and he continues as the head coach at Theodore Roosevelt High School in Wyandotte, Michigan. He was inducted into the Michigan High School Football Association's Coaches Hall of Fame.

References

1966 births
Living people
American football quarterbacks
Eastern Michigan Eagles football players
Detroit Drive players
Tampa Bay Storm players
Players of American football from Michigan
People from Taylor, Michigan